Gigo may refer to:

People
 Gigo Gabashvili (1862–1936), Georgian painter and educator
 Gigō Funakoshi (1906–1945), Japanese karateka

Places

Other
 Garbage in, garbage out
 The GIGO E.P